Andrew Singh Kooner (born 11 May 1979 in Kettering, Northamptonshire, England) is a Canadian boxer and trainer, currently living in Toronto.

Amateur career
Andrew Kooner moved to Tecumseh, Ontario at a young age and began boxing at age 13 out of a Windsor boxing club. At the 2000 Summer Olympics he lost in the 2nd round in the flyweight division. In 1998 he won the bronze medal at the Commonwealth Games; and in 2002 he won the silver medal at the Commonwealth Games.  At the 2004 Summer Olympics he finished tied for fifth in the bantamweight (54 kg) division after having qualified at the 1st AIBA American 2004 Olympic Qualifying Tournament in Tijuana, Mexico. He also defeated Juan Manuel López  in the amateurs.

Olympic results
2000 Olympics
Defeated Nacer Keddam (Algeria) 18-11
Lost to Wijan Ponlid (Thailand) 7-11
2004 Olympics
Defeated Alexander Espinoza (Venezuela) 37-20
Lost to Bahirdirdjon Sultanov (Uzbekistan) 32-44

Pro career
Kooner turned pro in 2006 and has a 10-2 Record and is the current bantamweight champion of Canada.

Post Boxing

Andrew Kooner currently resides in Toronto and runs his own fitness program, Kooner's Boxing, providing specialized training ranging from fitness to well-being to training up-and-coming boxers. He is also a coach for Rock Steady Boxing, a program that gives people with Parkinson’s disease hope by improving their quality of life through a non-contact boxing-based fitness curriculum.

References

External links
 
 Chris Johnson's Fighting Alliance - Kooner's Boxing Club
 Andrew Kooner Official Website - Website

1979 births
Living people
Boxers at the 2000 Summer Olympics
Boxers at the 1998 Commonwealth Games
Commonwealth Games bronze medallists for Canada
Boxers at the 2002 Commonwealth Games
Commonwealth Games silver medallists for Canada
Boxers at the 2003 Pan American Games
Boxers at the 2004 Summer Olympics
Canadian male boxers
Canadian Sikhs
English male boxers
English emigrants to Canada
Olympic boxers of Canada
Boxing people from Ontario
Sportspeople from Kettering
Canadian sportspeople of Indian descent
People from Essex County, Ontario
Pan American Games bronze medalists for Canada
Commonwealth Games medallists in boxing
Pan American Games medalists in boxing
Bantamweight boxers
Medalists at the 2003 Pan American Games
Medallists at the 1998 Commonwealth Games
Medallists at the 2002 Commonwealth Games